Charles Bond may refer to:
Sir Charles Bond, 4th Baronet (1734–1767), of the Bond baronets
Charles Henry Bond (1846–1908), American businessman who was president and general manager of Waitt & Bond
Charles John Bond (1856–1939), British doctor
Sir Charles Hubert Bond (1870–1945), British psychiatrist and mental health administrator
Charles Anson Bond (1873–1943), American businessman and 37th mayor of Columbus, Ohio
Charles G. Bond (1877–1974), United States Representative from New York
Chuck Bond (1914–1989), American football player
Charles Bond (pilot) (1915–2009), aviator and member of the American Volunteer Group
Charles Derek Bond (1927–2018), Bishop of Bradwell, 1976–1993

See also
Bond (disambiguation)